The Bellflower Bunnies is a children's animated series based on the Beechwood Bunny Tales books by Geneviève Huriet, Amélie Sarn and Loïc Jouannigot. It debuted on TF1, a French television network, on 24 December 2001. Many French and Canadian companies have participated in the show's production over the years; TF1 has always been involved. The series is written by Valérie Baranski, and produced by Patricia Robert. Moran Caouissin directed the first season, and Eric Berthier did the last two.

The show centres on the adventures and exploits of the Bellflower family, a clan of seven rabbits who live in Beechwood Grove. The two adults in the family, Papa Bramble and Aunt Zinnia, take care of their five children: Periwinkle, Poppy, Mistletoe, Dandelion and Violette.

The Bellflower Bunnies originally aired on TFOU TV (formerly TF! Jeunesse), the children's service of TF1, and has since appeared on France's local Disney Junior (formerly Playhouse Disney). The series has also been broadcast on CBC Television and TFO in Canada, KI.KA in Germany, Portugal's RTP in the Azores, and in several other countries.

The show has fifty-two episodes: four in the first season, twenty-two in the second, and twenty-six in the third.  
In the entire series, thirteen are based directly on installments in Beechwood Bunny Tales, published by Milan Presse of France and Gareth Stevens in the United States; the rest are based on scripts by Valérie Baranski. Distributors in Europe, North America, and South Korea have released DVDs of the first two seasons.

Overview
The English episode titles come from Feature Films for Families and Direct Source's Region 1 DVDs, as well as the online schedules of the Al Jazeera Children's Channel in the Middle East (for season 2).

Season 1

Season 2

Season 3

Notes

References
General

Some French titles for season 3 were provided by TFO's schedules during its summer 2008 run, before the episodes premiered on France.

Specific

External links

Official site for the U.S. distributors, Feature Films for Families and Direct Source
Official sites for the French distributors, TF1 Vidéo, Beez Entertainment and Seven Sept

Bellflower Bunnies
Bellflower Bunnies episodes